Robert Clements may refer to:

 Robert S. Clements, founder of Clements Worldwide, a global insurance company
 Robert Clements (1664–1722), Irish MP for Newry 1715–22
 Robert Clements (1724–1747), Irish MP for Cavan Borough 1745–47
 Robert George Clements (1880–1947), physician and fellow of the Royal College of Surgeons
 Robert Clements, 1st Earl of Leitrim (1732–1804), Irish nobleman and politician
 Robert Clements (footballer), Scottish footballer, played for Scotland in 1891
 Robert Clements (Nebraska politician) (born 1950), American politician and businessman